Joseph Thomas Mounsey (30 August 1871 – 6 April 1949) was an English first-class cricketer who played 92 games for Yorkshire County Cricket Club between 1891 and 1897.  He also played a first-class match for 'XI of Yorkshire' in 1894, and in non first-class games for Yorkshire Colts, Yorkshire Second XI, and Yorkshire.

Born in Heeley, Sheffield, Yorkshire, England, Mounsey was a right-handed batsman who scored 1,963 runs at 15.57, with a top score of 64 against Hampshire.  He took 13 wickets at 36.61, with his right arm medium pacers, with a best performance of 3 for 58.

At the end of his first-class playing career with Yorkshire, Mounsey became cricket coach at Charterhouse School, Godalming, Surrey.

He died in April 1949 in Ockford Ridge, Godalming.

References

External links
Cricinfo Profile

1871 births
1949 deaths
Yorkshire cricketers
Cricketers from Sheffield
English cricketers